Percy Francis Westerman (1876 – 22 February 1959) was an English author of children's literature, with a prolific output. Many of his books are adventure stories with military and naval themes.

Biography
He was born in Portsmouth, England in 1876, and educated at Portsmouth Grammar School, before taking up a clerical appointment at Portsmouth Dockyard at the age of twenty. He married Florence Wager, of Portsmouth, in 1900. Always keen sailors, they spent part of their honeymoon sailing in the Solent. Their son, John F.C. Westerman, born in 1901, also wrote adventure books for boys.

At the age of 70 he was reluctantly forced by a fall to leave his houseboat for dry land, but he continued writing apace. He died at the age of 82, and his last book, Mistaken Identity, was published posthumously in 1959.

Writing career
His writing career allegedly began with a sixpence bet made with his wife that he could write a better story than the one he was reading to his son, who was at the time ill with chickenpox.

His first book for boys, A Lad of Grit, was published by Blackie and Son Limited in 1908. In the same year, Baden-Powell founded the Scouting movement, which strongly influenced many of Westerman's books – he was a particularly keen supporter of the Sea Scouts.

He published a further three books in 1911, which were so successful that he gave up his Admiralty appointment that year to become a full-time author. He lived on board a houseboat – a converted Thames barge – on the River Frome at Wareham in Dorset, where he wrote the majority of his books.

An early book, The Flying Submarine (published in 1912) may indicate Westerman's genre. This boys' adventure novel was about a mysterious man from a South American country. He was an inventor, who had discovered a new kind of lighter-than-air gas that he called “helia”, which was much lighter than helium or hydrogen. He used helia in many inventions, including back-packs that could help a man float in the air or fly upwards, and in the remarkable titular submarine that could, when enough helia was used, fly! Eventually he used his flying submarine to win a war between his South American country and its belligerent neighbour.

It is highly likely that Westerman derived the idea for this super-weapon from Jules Verne's Terror, the speedboat, submarine, automobile, or aircraft superweapon invented by Verne's arch-hero Robur in Master of the World and The Clipper of the Clouds.

Similarly Westerman's South American conflict reflects the wars between Paraguay and Uruguay.

During the First World War, he was initially employed on coastal duties by the Royal Navy, but in 1918 he was commissioned, like W. E. Johns, in the Royal Flying Corps, as an instructor of navigation. During the Second World War he commanded the Arne platoon of the 7th Dorset Home Guard battalion (Wareham) from June 1940 until 26/12/1942. He wrote to Blackie of his service in the two wars that "neither appointment seriously interfered with my literary output."

During the 1930s Westerman was voted the most popular author of stories for boys. His books sold over one and a half million copies in his lifetime (total sales at his death were 1,599,000). He published at least 174 books, with 12 different firms.

Bibliography

Publication dates as listed by the British Library. Many titles were reissued subsequently, some several times.

Series
His publishing house S. W. Partridge included Westerman in a series entitled 'The Great Adventure Series' along with Rowland Walker, author of Oscar Danby, V.C.

Example illustrations of Westerman's books
Westerman's books were illustrated, as was the norm with books intended for the juvenile market. Typically they had from four to six full page illustration, although some had more. The Sea Monarch, which had originally been serialised in The Captain in 1911, had 12 full page illustrations. The Project Gutenberg edition of the book has eight more illustrations (not full pages size), as the book was scanned from Volume XXV of The Captain rather than from the book published by A. C. Black.

Illustrations for Westerman's first book
Illustrations by Edward S. Hodgson for A Lad of Grit: A Story of Adventure on Land and Sea in Restoration Times (1908). This was the first book by Westerman and the first of seventeen of his books to be illustrated by Hodgson. By courtesy of Project Gutenberg.

Illustrations for one of Westerman's First World War stories

Illustrations by Edward S. Hodgson for Winning his Wings: A story of the R. A. F. (1920) by Westerman. This was another story by Westerman set in the First World War. It was one of seventeen books by Westerman illustrated by Hodgson. By courtesy of Project Gutenberg.

See also
G. A. Henty
W. E. Johns
Herbert Strang

Notes

References

Sources
J.F.C. and Percy Westerman
Obituary of Mr. Percy F. Westerman, The Times (London). 25 February 1959.

External links
 
 
 
 westermanyarns
 

1876 births
1959 deaths
20th-century English novelists
People educated at The Portsmouth Grammar School
English children's writers
Writers from Portsmouth
Royal Flying Corps officers
British Home Guard officers
British Army personnel of World War I
Royal Navy personnel of World War I
Military personnel from Portsmouth